The 1986–87 Sussex County Football League season was the 62nd in the history of Sussex County Football League a football competition in England.

Division One

Division One featured 14 clubs which competed in the division last season, along with two new clubs, promoted from Division Two:
Haywards Heath
Wick

League table

Division Two

Division Two featured 13 clubs which competed in the division last season, along with three new clubs:
Bexhill Town, promoted from Division Three
Ringmer, relegated from Division One
Seaford Town, promoted from Division Three

Also, Albion United changed name to Little Common Albion.

League table

Division Three

Division Three featured 13 clubs which competed in the division last season, along with one new club:
Lingfield, relegated from Division Two

League table

References

1986-87
1986–87 in English football leagues